Mineral is an unincorporated community and census-designated place (CDP) in Lewis County, Washington, on State Route 7 near the Pierce/Lewis county line. Mineral originally began as a logging camp and mining town. Prospectors searching the area for gold instead found coal and arsenic. By the early 1920s, the mines closed, and with a devastating fire to the town's largest sawmill, Mineral began to turn to tourism as its main industry, primarily through recreational fishing on Mineral Lake.

The Mineral Log Lodge, built in 1906, was listed to the National Register of Historic Places in 1975.

History

The town was founded no later than 1897 on the shore of Mineral Lake, adopting the name from the lake and the veins of ruby of arsenic in the region. The area would be referred to as Mineral City and Mineral Creek in its early days. The lake was once known as "Goldsboro Lake".

Primarily a timber community, arsenic mines would open and the population peaked at 1,000 residents by the 1920s, with a flourishing downtown district. However, mining efforts would cease due to more efficient methods being available to obtain the mineral, and the largest mill, owned by the Mineral Lake Lumber Company, would be destroyed by fire in 1922 and never rebuilt. The town would shrink in size and would become a "bedroom community".

In 1985, Mineral was the location of the Mineral, Washington murders, one of the most famous unsolved murder cases in the United States.

Over 500 acres were purchased by the YMCA of Greater Seattle in 2021, with support from the Nisqually Indian Tribe, to create a campground north of Mineral on the lake. Future plans may include acquisition of up to 1600 more acres in several phases over the coming decades.

Geography

Water from Mineral Lake flows north down Mineral Creek to the Nisqually River, which reaches Puget Sound northeast of Olympia.

Parks and recreation

Mineral affords views of Mount Rainier. Mineral is most noted as a fishing destination. The lake is stocked yearly with rainbow trout and other fish species. On the opening weekend of Washington's fishing season, the town more than triples in population due to the influx of anglers. The local catch-phrase is "Mineral Lake, home of the 10 pound trout."

Mineral is also near the location of the famous Kenneth Arnold UFO sighting in 1947.

Climate
This region experiences warm (but not hot) and dry summers, with no average monthly temperatures above 71.6 °F.  According to the Köppen Climate Classification system, Mineral has a warm-summer Mediterranean climate, abbreviated "Csb" on climate maps.

Education

The Mineral Elementary School, opened in 1944 as a replacement for a previous school that burned down, closed in 2003. Students in the community are overseen by the Morton School District.

Government and politics

Politics

Mineral leans heavily towards the Republican Party and Conservatism.

The results for the 2020 U.S. Presidential Election for the Mineral voting district were as follows:

 Donald J. Trump (Republican) - 281 (64.90%)
 Joe Biden (Democrat) - 141 (32.56%)
 Jo Jorgensen (Libertarian) - 6 (1.39%)
 Other candidates - 3 (0.69%)
 Write-in candidate - 2 (0.46%)

References
 C. Michael Hogan (2008) Douglas-fir: Pseudotsuga menziesii, globalTwitcher.com, ed. Nicklas Strõmberg

Line notes

External links
 Mineral Lake community website
 Mineral Lake webcam
 MineralLakeWebcam.com

Populated places in Lewis County, Washington